Southern Management Companies is a privately owned property management company in the Mid-Atlantic.

The company owns more than 25,000 apartment units across 76 properties, three hotels, and 1 million square feet in commercial space in the Baltimore/DC area and a ski resort, hotel, and conference center, Bear Creek, in Macungie, Pennsylvania.

History 
The company (originally Central Management) was founded by David Hillman in 1965, when he purchased his first multifamily community, Lakeside North, in Prince George's County, Maryland. The corporate headquarters is located in Vienna, Virginia, with a secondary corporate office located in College Park, Maryland.

While the company is primarily known for acquiring and improving existing apartment communities, they have also been involved in development projects such as The Hotel at the University of Maryland located in College Park, Maryland and the Arundel, an apartment community located in Hanover, Maryland, both of which opened in 2017. In 2018, they built and franchised the Cambria Hotel in College park. They have also completed several rehabs of historic buildings in downtown Baltimore such as the Standard Oil Building (The Standard at Preston Gardens), The Baltimore Gas and Electric Company Building (39 West Lexington), and The Atrium.

In 2016, Southern Management received recognition from the Malcolm Baldrige National Quality Award for Performance Excellence for their best practices in the workforce category.

In December 2017, David Hillman nominated his wife, Suzanne Hillman, CEO of Southern Management. Suzanne was hired in 1975 as an accountant for Southern Management and later took on additional roles. Prior to her change in title, she had been an officer and CFO of the company for over thirty years.

Southern Management Leadership Program 
The Southern Management Leadership Program (formerly the Hillman Entrepreneurs Program) serves to develop local community leaders through a scholarship and intensive mentoring program at Prince George's Community College, Montgomery College and the University of Maryland, College Park. Students complete their associate's degree at Prince George's Community College or Montgomery College and transfer as a cohort to complete their undergraduate education at the University of Maryland, College Park. When they graduate, they continue to stay connected through professional relationships and lifelong friendships.

The program was founded by David Hillman, Suzanne Hillman (the current President and CEO of Southern Management Corporation) and the Hillman Family, as a way to enrich the education of students in Prince George's and Montgomery Counties. These communities are where Southern Management got its start more than 50 years ago, and where the company's deep roots have stood firm ever since. The mission of the Southern Management Leadership Program is to develop strong leaders, who will use their educations and experiences to make positive and lasting impacts in their hometowns.

The Southern Management Leadership Program benefits the students in many ways – providing financial, academic and professional assistance. Scholarships for Southern Management Leaders account for 55% of tuition at either Montgomery College or Prince George's Community College and up to 50% tuition at the University of Maryland. The students are also eligible to receive additional funds for books and other required technology and benefit from one-on-one advising and mentoring from dedicated Program Directors at each of the three schools.

References

External links
 

American companies established in 1965
1965 establishments in Virginia
Companies based in Vienna, Virginia
Property management companies
Privately held companies based in Virginia